State Secret is a 1995 Italian thriller film directed by Giuseppe Ferrara. It was entered into the 19th Moscow International Film Festival.

Cast
 Massimo Ghini as Carlo Tommasi
 Massimo Dapporto as Beppe Fossati
 Antonello Fassari as Carmine Muschio
 Isabel Russinova as Judge Francesca Savona
 Mariella Valentini as Laura Melli
 Tony Sperandeo as Gangster
 Tino Bianchi as Banker
 Aldo Massasso
 Adriana Russo as Lilli
 Alfredo Pea as Torre
 Giampiero Bianchi as Minister
 Adalberto Maria Merli as Ermes Ravida

References

External links
 

1995 films
1995 thriller films
1990s Italian-language films
Films directed by Giuseppe Ferrara
Italian thriller films
Films scored by Pino Donaggio
1990s Italian films